Coffee Plant/Second Ward is a light rail station in Houston, Texas on the METRORail system. It is served by the Green Line and is located on Harrisburg Boulevard between York and Hutcheson streets. The station is named for the Second Ward neighborhood as well as a former Maxwell House coffee manufacturing plant. In 2006, Maxwell House sold the plant to Maximus Coffee Group which currently operates the plant under the Atlantic Coffee Solutions brand.

Coffee Plant/Second Ward station opened on May 23, 2015, as part of the Green Line's first phase.

References

METRORail stations
Railway stations in the United States opened in 2015
2015 establishments in Texas
Railway stations in Harris County, Texas